is a Japanese entertainment reporter.

Biography
She was from Tokyo. After graduating from Tokyo Announcement Academy, she became a reporter for gourmet programmes and travel programmes broadcast on cable television. After that, she made her wide-show reporting debut at Nippon TV's Let's!

Appearing programmes

Current

Former

Internet

Mobile websites

References

External links
 

Japanese women journalists
People from Tokyo
1976 births
Living people